A bodega cat (also referred to as a deli cat, store cat, or shop cat) is a type of working cat that inhabits a bodega, which in New York City English refers to a convenience store or deli. Much like farm cats, library cats, and ship cats, a bodega cat is typically a mixed breed cat kept as a form of biological pest control to manage or prevent rodent infestations. 

A bodega cat may be a domesticated cat that is kept by the bodega owner, or a semi-feral cat that the bodega owner attracts to the store through regular feeding. Public health departments typically prohibit bodega cats under food codes that ban live animals from establishments where consumable goods are sold.

Etymology

The term is derived from bodega, a Spanish word that translates to "storeroom" or "wine cellar". It is typically used in New York City to refer to a convenience store that sells groceries, deli meats, sandwiches, soft drinks, and other general staples. The term is commonly associated with businesses in New York City and other American cities with substantial Latino populations.

Legality

The New York City Department of Health and Mental Hygiene considers bodega cats a "general deficiency", citing concerns over the potential they pose for food contamination. Under Chapter 23 of the Food Service Establishment Violation Penalty Schedule, establishments selling food that keep live animals that are not service animals or fish kept in tanks are subject to a fine ranging from $200 to $350. Despite this, cats remain a ubiquitous presence at many of the more than 10,000 bodegas across New York City; The New York Times reports that many bodega owners keep cats in spite of the law because they are seen as preferable to rodent infestations, which also carry a fine of $300.

In culture
Bodega cats are a part of internet culture, as well as New York City culture. Multiple blogs and social media accounts are devoted to chronicling photographs of bodega cats across the city. In 2019, a Saturday Night Live sketch starring John Mulaney parodied the musical Cats using a bodega cat. That same year, a bodega cat at 71 Fresh Deli and Grocery in Kips Bay, Manhattan, was stolen from the store; the cat's theft was widely covered in New York City media, with The New York Times, New York Daily News, and NY1 reporting on the incident.  

There have also been numerous illustrations of bodega cats as a cultural symbol.

See also

References

Biological pest control
Working cats
Culture of New York City